Reto Amstutz (born February 24, 1993) is a Swiss professional ice hockey player. He is currently playing with the SC Bern of Switzerland's National League A.

Amstutz participated at the 2012 World Junior Ice Hockey Championships as a member of the Switzerland men's national junior ice hockey team.

References

External links

1993 births
Living people
SC Bern players
Swiss ice hockey centres